Eleonora Vindau (born 19 August 1986) is a Ukrainian soprano opera singer. She sang the role of Dunyasha in the world premiere of Alexander Smelkov's opera The Station Master, staged at the Concert Hall of the Mariinsky Theatre in 2011 and is a laureate of IV All-Russian Nadezhda Obukhova Young Opera Singers' Competition (Lipetsk, 2008) and the VIII International Rimsky-Korsakov Young Opera Singers' Competition (St Petersburg, 2008)

Life and career
Vindau was born in Kyiv and graduated from the Tchaikovsky National Academy of Music of Ukraine in 2009. Since 2007, she has been a soloist with the Mariinsky Academy of Young Singers and has toured with the Mariinsky Opera where her repertoire includes: 
 Xenia in Boris Godunov 
 Brigitta in Iolanta 
 Dunyasha in The Station Master 
 Zerlina in Don Giovanni 
 Countess Almaviva and Susanna in Le nozze di Figaro 
 Despina in Così fan tutte 
 Papagena Die Zauberflöte 
 Pedro in Don Quichotte 
 Echo in Ariadne auf Naxos 
 Soprano soloist in Handel's Messiah

Internationally, she has sung Birgitta in Iolanta at the Gran Teatre del Liceu in Barcelona (2013)  and the Théâtre du Capitole in Toulouse (2010). In 2011 she sang Lauretta in Betrothal in a Monastery at the Opéra-Comique in Paris and the Théâtre du Capitole.

Vindau was married to the Ukrainian baritone Andrei Bondarenko.

References

External links
 Profile at Askonas Holt Artist Management. 
 A debut in the opera Le nozze di Figaro. 
 A debut in the opera Don Quixote on the stage of the Bolshoi theatre. 
 St. Petersburg: Weiße Nächte am Mariinsky Theater — Nozze di Figaro / Götterdämmerung. 
 

1986 births
Musicians from Kyiv
Living people
Ukrainian operatic sopranos
Kyiv Conservatory alumni
21st-century Ukrainian women opera singers